Tornado Cash (also stylized as TornadoCash) is an open source, non-custodial, fully decentralized cryptocurrency tumbler that runs on Ethereum Virtual Machine-compatible networks. It offers a service that mixes potentially identifiable or "tainted" cryptocurrency funds with others, so as to obscure the trail back to the fund's original source. This is a privacy tool used in EVM networks where all transactions are public by default.

The project is governed through a decentralized autonomous organization (DAO) and using the $TORN token as a voting system for protocol updates.

On 18 August 2022, Tornado Cash was present on the Ethereum (ETH), Binance Smart Chain, Polygon, and Optimism networks, with Ethereum being the most-used one, having had over US$7.6 billion in ETH go through the mixer.

Functionality 
Tornado Cash uses multiple smart contracts that accept different quantities of ETH and ERC-20 deposits. These deposits can later be withdrawn to a different address by providing a cryptographic proof, hence breaking the link in the chain between the sender and the recipient. Zero-knowledge proofs (in particular zk-SNARKs) are used to ensure privacy, and there is no way to link a withdrawal to its deposit, which ensures asset confidentiality.

OFAC blacklisting 
On 8 August 2022, the Office of Foreign Assets Control of the U.S. Department of the Treasury blacklisted Tornado Cash, making it illegal for United States citizens, residents, and companies to receive or send money through the service. The Treasury Department accused it of laundering more than $7 billion in virtual currencies, including $455 million believed to have been stolen in 2022 by the Lazarus Group, a hacking group associated with the government of North Korea.

Reactions 

The same day, the domain used by the project was taken down, and GitHub removed the Tornado Cash repository and suspended the developers' accounts.

Circle, the company behind USD Coin, froze about $75,000 in USDC from Ethereum addresses belonging to the mixer.

On 10 August 2022, Tornado Cash developer Alexey Pertsev was arrested in Amsterdam on the suspicion of "involvement in concealing criminal financial flows and facilitating money laundering through the mixing of cryptocurrencies through the decentralised Ethereum mixing service Tornado Cash."

See also 

 Blender.io

References

External links
 
 Tornado Cash Blog at Medium
 Understanding Zero-Knowledge Proofs Through the Source Code of Tornado Cash

Cryptocurrency tumblers
Decentralized autonomous organizations